Róža Domašcyna (11 August 1951, in district of Bautzen, East Germany) is a poet, translator and writer. She writes in German and in the Upper Sorbian language. Winner of the promotional award for Ćišinski-Preis and Anna Seghers Prize (1998).

Works 
 Wróćo ja doprědka du (English: I go back to the front), 1990
 Zaungucker, 1991
 Pře wšě płoty (English: Over all fences), 1994
 Zwischen gangbein und springbein, 1995
 Der Hase im Ärmel, Illustration: Angela Hampel, 1997, 2011
 Selbstredend selbzweit selbdritt, 1998
 Kunstgriff am netzwerg, 1999
 Pobate bobate, 1999
 "sp", 2001
 MY NA AGRA, 2004
 stimmfaden, 2006
 Balonraketa (two texts for the theater), 2008
 ort der erdung, 2011
 «Prjedy hač woteńdźeš», 2011.
 Štož ći wětřik z ruki wěje, 2012
 Feldlinien, 2014
 Die dörfer unter wasser sind in deinem kopf beredt, 2016
 znaki pominaki kopolaki (together with Měrana Cušcyna and Měrka Mětowa), 2019
 W času zeza časa, 2019
 stimmen aus der unterbühne, 2020
 Poesiealbum 354, 2020

References

Literature 
 Dichtung des 20. Jahrhunderts: Meine 24 sächsischen Dichter, Hrsg. Gerhard Pötzsch, 2 CDs, Militzke Verlag Leipzig 2009, ISBN 978-3-86189-935-8
 Dueck, Cheryl. "Selbstredend selbzweit selbdritt: Serpentine selves in the poetry of Róža Domašcyna." Canadian Slavonic Papers 45, no. 3-4 (2003): 283-294.

1951 births
Living people
People from Bautzen (district)
Sorbian-language writers
Writers from Saxony
German women poets
20th-century German poets
20th-century German women writers